Vamma Power Station  (Vamma kraftstasjon) is a hydroelectric power station located on the river Glomma approximately 4.5 km south of Askim, Østfold, Norway.
Sam Eyde formed Vamma Fossekompagnie in 1902 to build a power plant for a fertilizer factory. The factory plans were canceled in 1912 and Vamma Fossekompagnie was sold to Hafslund (company).
Construction of the power station started in 1907 and in 1915 the first two turbines were completed. Another six turbines were built between 1915 and 1927. In 1944 the final two were complete.

In 2015 the construction of a twelfth turbine began on the south side of the dam. The new turbine will allow the ten old turbines to only be used during the spring flood season, giving the plant more flexibility. The turbine is expected to add another 230GWh to the annual production.
Testing of the turbine began on 16 May 2019., and was officially opened on September 8, 2019, by prime minister Erna Solberg.
With the new turbine in operation it will be the largest run-of-the-river hydroelectric plant in Norway.

See also

References 

Hydroelectric power stations in Norway
Buildings and structures in Østfold